Andżelika Wójcik (born 8 November 1996) is a Polish speed skater.

She won a medal at the 2020 World Single Distances Speed Skating Championships.

References

External links

1996 births
Living people
Polish female speed skaters
People from Lubin
World Single Distances Speed Skating Championships medalists
World Sprint Speed Skating Championships medalists
Speed skaters at the 2022 Winter Olympics
Olympic speed skaters of Poland
21st-century Polish women